Phillip Douglas Russell (born July 21, 1952) is a Canadian former professional ice hockey defenceman who played over one thousand games in the National Hockey League. Russell featured in the 1973 Stanley Cup Finals with the Chicago Blackhawks.

Russell had a reputation as a bruising, physical player and retired with over 2000 penalty minutes to go along with 424 career points. He played for the Chicago Black Hawks, Atlanta/Calgary Flames, New Jersey Devils and Buffalo Sabres, and retired in 1988. He was most recently an assistant coach with the Springfield Falcons of the American Hockey League. Russell was born in Edmonton, Alberta.

In 2007, Russell was hired as an assistant coach for the now defunct Pensacola Ice Pilots of the ECHL under John Marks.

Career statistics

Regular season and playoffs

International

Coaching statistics
 
Season  Team                  Lge Type            GP  W    L  T OTL    Pct    Result 
1988-89 Muskegon Lumberjacks  IHL Assistant coach 
1989-90 Muskegon Lumberjacks  IHL Assistant coach 
1990-91 Muskegon Lumberjacks  IHL Assistant coach  
1991-92 Muskegon Lumberjacks  IHL Head coach      82  41  28  0  13  0.579  Lost in finals 
1992-93 Cleveland Lumberjacks IHL Head coach      82  39  34  0  9   0.530  Lost in round 1 
1999-00 Cleveland Lumberjacks IHL Head coach             
2004-05 Springfield Falcons   AHL Assistant coach 
2005-06 Springfield Falcons   AHL Assistant coach 
2007-08 Pensacola Ice Pilots  ECHL Assistant coach

Awards
 WCHL First All-Star Team – 1972

See also
List of NHL players with 1,000 games played
List of NHL players with 2,000 career penalty minutes

References

External links

1952 births
Atlanta Flames players
Buffalo Sabres players
Calgary Flames captains
Calgary Flames players
Canadian ice hockey defencemen
Chicago Blackhawks draft picks
Chicago Blackhawks players
Chicago Blackhawks scouts
Edmonton Oil Kings (WCHL) players
Kalamazoo Wings (1974–2000) players
Living people
National Hockey League All-Stars
National Hockey League first-round draft picks
New Jersey Devils players
Pittsburgh Penguins scouts
Ice hockey people from Edmonton